Alistair Fenwick (born 15 November 1951) is a retired British auto racing driver. His most famous drive was in the 1990 24 Hours of Le Mans. He drove for the GP Motorsport Team, alongside Alex Postan and New Zealand driver Craig Simmiss. In the last placed car to complete the race, he finished fifth in the C2 Class, twenty-eighth overall. In 1991 he entered round twelve of the British Touring Car Championship, but failed to start the race.

Racing record

Complete British Touring Car Championship results
(key) (Races in bold indicate pole position) (Races in italics indicate fastest lap)

References

British Touring Car Championship drivers
British racing drivers
24 Hours of Le Mans drivers
1951 births
Living people